Cyrtophyllum is a genus of tropical Asian tree species in the family Gentianaceae and the tribe Potalieae.   Species may have previously been placed in the genus Fagraea and can be found in Indo-China and Malesia.

Species
Plants of the World Online  currently includes five accepted species:
 Cyrtophyllum caudatum (Ridl.) K.M.Wong
 Cyrtophyllum fragrans (Roxb.) DC. (the Tembusu tree)
 Cyrtophyllum giganteum (Ridl.) Ridl.
 Cyrtophyllum lanceolatum DC.
 Cyrtophyllum minutiflorum K.M.Wong

References

External links
 
 

 Gentianales genera
 Gentianaceae
 Flora of Indo-China 
 Flora of Malesia